The Alpini Battalion "Tirano" is an inactive battalion of the Italian Army's mountain infantry speciality, the Alpini, which distinguished itself in combat during World War I and World War II.

History 

The battalion was raised on 1 November 1886 by renaming Alpini Battalion "Valtellina" of the 5th Alpini Regiment. The battalion's name, like the names of all Alpini battalions raised before World War I, was the name of the location of the battalion's depot; in the Tirano's case the village of Tirano in the Valtellina valley. As with all Alpini battalions the recruits for the battalions were drafted exclusively from the area surrounding the depot. The battalion consisted of the 46th, 48th and 49th Alpini companies.

The Tirano battalion's history is intertwined with the history of the 5th Alpini Regiment, with which it served in World War I and in World War II. During the latter the regiment was part of the 2nd Alpine Division "Tridentina" and served in the Greco-Italian War and as part of the Italian Army in Russia on the Eastern Front, where regiment and battalion barely escaped annihilation during the Battle of Nikolayevka in January 1943. For its conduct during the two campaigns the 5th Alpini Regiment was awarded two Gold Medals of Military Valour.

After the defeat of the Italian Army in Russia 150 survivors of the Tirano were repatriated in spring 1943 and garrisoned in the village of Mühlbach in South Tyrol. After the announcement of the Armistice of Cassibile on 8 September 1943 5th Alpini Regiment its battalions were disbanded by the Germans.

Cold War 
After World War II the 5th Alpini Regiment was reformed on 1 January 1953, in the city of Meran with the battalions "Tirano" and "Edolo" as the infantry component of the Alpine Brigade "Orobica". During the 1975 army reform the 5th Alpini Regiment was disbanded on 30 November 1975 and its battalions came under the direct command of the Orobica. As the traditions and war flag of the 5th Alpini Regiment were assigned to the "Morbegno" battalion, the Tirano was granted a new war flag on 12 November 1976 by decree 846 of the President of the Italian Republic Giovanni Leone. The two Gold Medals of Military Valour and the Messina earthquake Medal of Merit awarded to the 5th Alpini Regiment, were duplicated for the new flag of the Tirano, and the Bronze Medal of Civil Valour awarded to the Tirano for its work after the Gleno Dam disaster was transferred from the flag of the 5th Alpini to the Tirano's flag. The battalion's structure on 1 December 1975 was as follows:

  Alpini Battalion "Tirano", in Mals
  46th Alpini Company, in Glurns
  48th Alpini Company, in Mals
  49th Alpini Company, in Glurns
  109th Mortar Company, in Mals

The battalion's task in case of war with the Warsaw Pact was to defend the Reschen Pass.

With the end of the Cold War the Italian Army began to downsize its forces and on 27 March 1991 the Tirano was disbanded and its flag transferred to the shrine of the flags at the Vittoriano in Rome.

External links
 Battaglione Alpini "Tirano" on vecio.it

Sources 
 Franco dell'Uomo, Rodolfo Puletti: "L'Esercito Italiano verso il 2000 - Volume Secondo - Tomo I", Rome 2001, Stato Maggiore dell'Esercito - Ufficio Storico, page: 512

References 

Alpini Battalions of Italy